Imini River is a river in Morocco. It flows from eastern Atlas Mountains and enters Ouarzazate River, which enters Draa River. It provides the surrounding areas with lush green grass and fresh water.

References

Rivers of Morocco